Econfina may refer to:

Econfina Creek, a small river in Jackson, Washington and Bay Counties, Florida
Econfina River, a small river in Taylor County, Florida
Econfina River State Park, on the Econfina River